A constitutional referendum on a number of changes to the constitution was held in Turkey on 12 September 2010. The results showed the majority supported the constitutional amendments, with 58% in favour and 42% against. The changes were aimed at bringing the constitution into compliance with European Union standards. Supporters of Turkish EU membership hope constitutional reform will facilitate the membership process.

Background

After the military coup of 12 September 1980, a new constitution was drafted, designed by the military junta that came to power. Thirty years later, a referendum was held regarding a number of amendments to that constitution.

In 2010, the Turkish parliament adopted a series of constitutional amendments. The amendments did not achieve the required two-thirds majority (67%) for immediately implementing the changes. However, a majority of 330 votes (60%) was achieved and sufficient to present the amendments to the electorate in a referendum. A constitutional change, to make it more difficult for the Supreme Court to dissolve parties, failed to pass.

The reform package was accepted by parliament on 7 May, initiating the referendum process. The referendum was expected to be held 60 days after the publication of the package in the Official Gazette, but the Supreme Election Board (YSK) announced that it would be held 120 days later, on 12 September.

Changes by theme

Coup leaders and military personnel
Provisional Article 15 of the Constitution, which provided protection to coup leaders, will be abolished. The amendments will allow the leaders of the 1980 coup to be sent to court. Military officers who commit crimes against the state, such as preparing coup plans, will be tried in civilian courts. Military personnel who are dismissed from the Turkish Armed Forces will have the right to appeal to the judiciary, the right to legal remedies and the right of defense.

Personal information such as names, photographs and ID information will be kept private. This kind of information will be stored only if the individual agrees to it, and individuals believing their personal information is being misused will be able to hold relevant entities accountable.

Economic and social rights
Businesspeople with tax debts will be able to travel abroad. Businesspeople facing an investigation or prosecution are prohibited from traveling abroad under current regulations. In the amendments, businesspeople will be able to travel abroad provided there is no court order restricting their travel.

Right to collective bargaining for government employees. While government employees will be granted the right to collective bargaining, the Public Employees' Arbitration Board consisting of government employee representatives will have the final say. The same right will be granted to the retired. Government employees who believe they have been punished unfairly will be able to go to court.

Restrictions on the right to strike will be removed. Restrictions on politically motivated strikes and lockouts will be removed to advance workers' rights. Labor unions will not be held liable for material damage to a workplace where a strike is being held as a result of deliberately negligent behavior by the workers and by the labor union.

The Economic and Social Council (ESK), which comprises representatives from unions, associations and confederations, will be given constitutional protection. The council will be effective in determining economic policies and the government's involvement in council activities will be removed.

Individual freedoms
Problems between the state and citizens will be resolved by way of an ombudsman without having to go to court. If citizens are not satisfied with judicial decisions, they will be able to directly petition the Constitutional Court.

Measures enacted to ensure equal rights for men and women will not be interpreted as contrary to the principle of equality, nor those enacted to protect children, elderly people, disabled people, widows and orphans of martyrs as well as for invalid and veterans.

Since the structure of the Constitutional Court will change, closing down parties will not be as easy as it used to be. Deputies will not be banned from politics if their party is closed down, but will keep their seats for the normal term.

Government workers, who until now could only be a member of one labor union, will now have a choice. Additionally, warnings and reprimands given to government employees will be open to judicial review. Government employees who believe they have been punished unfairly will be able to make claims in court.

Judicial reforms
Parliament will choose some of the members of the Constitutional Court. The number of Constitutional Court members will be expanded. Parliament will appoint three members while the president will appoint 14 members. The Constitutional Court will obtain a more democratic structure, consisting of two parts and functioning as a general assembly.

The Supreme Board of Judges and Prosecutors (HSYK) will increase in number from 7 to 22. Members will no longer be elected only by the Supreme Court of Appeals and the Council of State. A total of 11 judges from around 13,000 judges will be appointed to the board to represent judges on the bench.

Dismissed judges will be able to appeal to the judiciary. The HSYK's decisions, like YAŞ decisions, will be open to judicial review. Prosecutors and judges dismissed by the board will be able to challenge dismissal decisions in court.

All citizens will be able to file a petition with the Constitutional Court. This is now only possible at the European Court of Human Rights.

Besides the President, the ministers and other senior government officials, the chairman of the parliament and the supreme commander of the Turkish army can now also appear in the Supreme Court (Yüce Divan).

Changes by article
Source: 

 Measures ensuring equality between men and women, and protecting children, the elderly, disabled people, widows and orphans of martyrs as well as for invalid and veterans would not be considered a violation of the principle of equality. (Revises Article 10)
 The protection of personal data and privacy would be revised, and everyone would be entitled to the protection of privacy. Access to data about personal information would be included within the new protection measures. (Revises Article 20)
 Travel bans would be relaxed. Trips abroad would be restricted only if a person is subject to a criminal investigation or a legal case. (Revises Article 23)
 Additional protections would be granted regarding family and children's rights. All children would expressly have the right to have direct communication with their mother and father and continue relations with them. (Revises Article 41)
 Public servants would be allowed to be members of more than one union. Civil servants would also have the right to collective bargaining with a body for conciliation to be established in the event of disagreement. (Revises Article 53)
 The ban on general strikes would be lifted. The measure would also include strikes held for political or solidarity purposes, as well as slowdown strikes. (Revises Article 54)
 An ombudsman system to deal with problems that may arise between state institutions and citizens would be established. Every citizen would be granted the right to request information and apply to the ombudsman. (Revises Article 74)
 Deputies would remain in their posts until their elected term ends, even if their parties are closed. (Revises Article 84)
 The tenure of deputies elected for Parliament's presidential board would be modified. (Revises Article 94)
 Decisions by the Supreme Military Council (YAŞ), that result in the expulsion of military officers from the Turkish Armed Forces, or TSK, would be allowed to be appealed in court. The amendment, however, has excluded YAŞ decisions that force military personnel to retire due to promotion procedures and the absence of tenure. Under current law, YAŞ decisions to expel military officers from the armed forces cannot be taken to court. (Revises Article 125)
 Public servants would be granted the right to collective bargaining with regard to their financial and social rights. (Revises Article 128)
 Public servants would be provided the right to apply to courts over censure or warning punishments they face in their workplaces. (Revises Article 129)
 Justice services and the supervision of prosecutors with regard to their administrative duties would be performed by Justice Ministry inspectors. (Revises Article 144)
 Civilian courts would be permitted to try military personnel, and military courts would not be permitted to try civilians other than during times of war. (Revises Article 145)
 The size and membership of the Constitutional Court would be restructured. The number of members of the country's top court would be raised to 17 from 11, and Parliament and the president would elect and appoint members. Currently only the president can appoint members to the Constitutional Court. (Revises Article 146)
 New court members would be selected for terms of 12 years or until they reach the age of 65. The current article does not set a term limit but stipulates that members retire upon reaching the age of 65. (Revises Article 147)
 Citizens would be allowed the right to make personal applications to the Constitutional Court. The article would also pave the way for the court to act as the Supreme Council and acquire the authority to judge the chief of General Staff, force commanders and the Parliament speaker in the event of abuses of power. It also allows for the appeal of decisions made while the court acts as the Supreme Council. (Revises Article 148)
 A quorum would be established for the Constitutional Court to convene and the minimum number of votes required to close a political party or annul constitutional amendments would be changed to two-thirds from three-fifths. (Revises Article 149)
 The organization and function of the military Supreme Court of Appeals would be restructured. (Revises Article 156)
 The function of the Supreme Military Administrative Court would be based on the principle of the freedom of the courts rather than the "necessity of military duty." (Revises Article 157)
 The HSYK would be restructured to consist of 22 regular and 12 substitute members. Nineteen members would be appointed, four by the president. The court would also function in three separate departments and would have the power to launch investigations against judges and prosecutors. (Revises Article 159)
 The Economic and Social Council would be established as a constitutional institution. The council provides consultation to the government in creating economic and social policies. (Revises Article 166)
 An article banning the prosecution of the 1980 coup leaders would be annulled. (Annuls temporary Article 15)

Voting in parliament
On 30 March 2010, Turkey's ruling party submitted its package of constitutional amendments to the parliament. The changes were passed in parliament in late April and early May 2010 with over 330 votes, below the two-thirds majority of 367 votes needed to pass them directly, but enough to send them to a referendum within sixty days after President Abdullah Gül signs the law.
On 13 May 2010, president Gül signed the reform package.

The composition of the parliament (550 seats) during the voting was as follows: AKP: 336, CHP: 97, MHP: 69, BDP: 20, Independent: 12, DSP: 6, DP: 1, TP: 1. The ruling Justice and Development Party (AKP) has 336 seats, but deputy Mehmet Ali Şahin cannot vote as he is the parliament speaker. CHP and BDP decided to boycott the voting. The Nationalist Movement Party (MHP) voted against the articles.

Each article required more than 330 votes in order to pass. The amendment for Article 69, which would have limited the ability of the Supreme Court to dissolve political parties, did not meet this threshold in the second round and was therefore dropped from the package.

Annulment of the package
The main opposition party CHP not only argues that the constitutional package includes unconstitutional reforms, but also that it was passed through procedural violations. It wants the Constitutional Court to review the proposal process. The CHP's legal advisers also argued that the changes the package makes to the structures of the Constitutional Court and the Supreme Board of Judges and Prosecutors (HSYK) are in violation of the constitutional principle of separation of powers. With this claim, the CHP alleges that the AKP is attempting to change one of Turkey's constitutional articles that cannot be amended. So in addition to a review of the package on procedural grounds, the CHP also demands a review of the content of the package. The CHP also demands a stay of the referendum results, bringing the total of CHP demands to three.

On 7 July 2010, the Turkish Constitutional Court delivered its final verdict on a package of constitutional amendments, which is to be subject to a public referendum on 12 September. The court has ruled in favour of the vast majority of the government's proposed reforms to the constitution. The court did not annul the whole package. Judges annulled certain parts of two articles, but rejected the demands of the Turkish opposition to scrap the whole package on technical grounds. The partially annulled articles pertain to the structure of the Constitutional Court and the Supreme Board of Judges and Prosecutors (HSYK). They were controversial due to the changes envisioned in the member appointment processes.

Both the government and the opposition expressed disappointment with the Court's decision.

Polls
A poll by Sonar Research in August 2010 forecasted 49.1% in favour of the draft and 50.9% opposed.

A poll by KONDA Research in September 2010 forecasted 56.8% in favour of the draft, 25.6% were opposed, while 17.6% were undecided.

Results

Results by province

Source:

Voting irregularities
Kemal Kılıçdaroğlu, the leader of the opposition represented by the Republican People's Party (CHP), could not vote because of a mix-up over where he should cast his ballot. "It was my responsibility to check the register of electors, but I could not do it due to my intense referendum campaign," he said.

Reactions

Domestic
Justice and Development Party (AKP) – Following the announcement of the results, Prime Minister Erdoğan said the state had "crossed a historic threshold toward advanced democracy and the supremacy of law."
 Republican People's Party (CHP) –  Pointing to the 42% of voters who said "No" at the referendum, Kılıçdaroğlu said such a figure could not be underestimated and his party had a major role in reaching such a rate. "When we look at the result, we see that the Justice and Development Party has taken a very important step towards creating a judiciary mechanism that is entirely dependent on itself," Kılıçdaroğlu said. He also added Erdoğan administration was seeking dangerous levels of control over the country's judiciary, with two of the 26 approved amendments allegedly giving excessive influence to the government over the courts.
Nationalist Movement Party (MHP) – Having been the first to publish a written statement, party leader Devlet Bahçeli claimed that with the constitutional amendments which will serve the backdoor intentions of the AKP to create a sectarian judiciary being approved by the Turkish nation, Turkey was dragged into the Dark Ages littered with dangers and vital threats, adding that bad days are ahead.

International
The result of the referendum was welcomed by a number of international observers.

  – The Enlargement Commissioner in the European Union, Štefan Füle, said: "As we consistently said in the past months, these reforms are a step in the right direction as they address a number of long-standing priorities in Turkey's efforts towards fully complying with the accession criteria." The European Parliamentary deputy Richard Howitt, spoke for the European Parliament's Socialist and Democrat Group when he declared his support for the referendum results. "The unexpectedly large 'yes' vote in Turkey's constitutional referendum is a sign of the population's support for reforms that will prepare the country for European Union membership." He also said it would be a blow to European critics who suggested Turkey does not have the political will to make the necessary reforms to join the EU. He also supported calls to draw up a new constitution through cross-party consensus.
 Council of Europe –  The Council of Europe's Secretary-General Thorbjorn Jagland called the move a significant step in the democratic development of Turkey. "The constitutional reform approved on Sunday is an important step forward towards bringing the country closer to European standards and practices."
  – Foreign Minister Guido Westerwelle issued a statement saying "I welcome the success of the referendum," "The reform of the constitution is another important step by Turkey on the road towards Europe."
  – Prime Minister George Papandreou called his Turkish counterpart to congratulate him for the government's success in Sunday's referendum on the constitutional amendment package. Greek Foreign Minister declared that the results of the referendum are a 'clear choice' and 'strong signal of support for the reforms promoted by Tayyip Erdoğan. "The Turkish people reaffirmed its commitment to the European perspective."
  – In a telephone conversation with Turkish Foreign Minister Ahmet Davutoglu, Iranian Foreign Minister Manouchehr Mottaki congratulated the Turkish nation's vote of confidence to the Ankara government in the recent referendum on constitutional amendments. According to a Foreign Ministry statement, both sides expressed hope for the further expansion of all-out ties and described First Vice President Mohammad Reza Rahimi's upcoming trip to Turkey as another step towards bolstering Tehran-Ankara relations.
  – Prime Minister Silvio Berlusconi has called the Turkish Prime Minister Tayyip Erdoğan to congratulate him for the "brilliant success" of the approval of the constitutional referendum and that there will be soon a bilateral summit between the two countries.
  – Prime Minister Hashim Thaçi has made a telephone conversation with the Prime Minister of the Republic of Turkey, Recep Tayyip Erdoğan, to congratulate him and in which Erdoğan expressed Turkey's continued willingness to support the Republic of Kosovo.
  – Prime Minister Saad al-Hariri telephoned his Turkish counterpart and congratulated him for the results of the referendum. Speaker of the Parliament Nabih Berri sent a telegram stating that this is a "historical and democratic victory" for Turkey and hoping that this referendum would be a lesson for democracy in the Middle East.
  – Prime Minister Yousuf Raza Gilani called Turkish Prime Minister Recep Tayyip Erdoğan on telephone and congratulated him on victory in the referendum held on 12 Sept. He said," the results of referendum show the confidence of Turkish people in the dynamic leadership and pro-people policies of Mr. Erdoğan". He further said that the results were clear manifestation of the proof that democracy and democratic norms have strengthened to bring about changes for betterment of the people. The Prime Minister also expressed gratitude for assistance of the Turkish government and the people through Turkish Red Crescent for the victims of the 2010 Pakistan floods.
  – President Mahmoud Abbas called Turkish Prime Minister Recep Tayyip Erdoğan to congratulate him for the success on the constitutional referendum.
  – Foreign Minister Miguel Angel Moratinos said the referendum sent a "clear signal of Turkey's European vocation and it demonstrates the commitment of the Turkish authorities to modernize the political and social institutions." "And although some countries still have doubts and reluctance, I believe that in the end logic will prevail," Moratinos told reporters ahead of a meeting of EU ministers in Brussels.
  – President Bashar al-Assad telephoned the Turkish Prime Minister Recep Tayyip Erdoğan to congratulate him for the results of the referendum.
  – Foreign Minister Carl Bildt said: "This opens the European door, even though it will take time to take that step." With the referendum, Turkey "paves the way for a more open and democratic evolution of the country."
  – President Barack Obama also welcomed the results and called the Turkish Prime Minister Recep Tayyip Erdoğan to congratulate him and "acknowledged the vibrancy of Turkey's democracy as reflected in the turnout for the referendum."

Aftermath
The Human Rights Association launched a petition to try Kenan Evren over his role in the 1980 coup, as Evren defended the coup, saying military intervention was needed to bring an end to years of violence between leftist and rightist factions.

Hüseyin Çelik, the deputy chairman of the AKP, said the party's agenda would now be to work on a new constitution after the 2011 elections.

References

External links
 Text of the Constitutional changes
Official translation of the proposed changes by the Government

Constitutional referendums in Turkey
Turkey
Referendum
Reform in Turkey
September 2010 events in Turkey